Daltopora is a genus of moths in the family Gelechiidae.

Species
 Daltopora felixi Povolný, 1979
 Daltopora sinanensis Sakamaki, 1995

References

Isophrictini